Ricky Lee Holmes (born 19 June 1987) is an English professional footballer who plays for Farnborough as a striker or a winger.

Career

Chelmsford City
Born in Rochford, started his career with Southend-based clubs Southend Manor and White Ensign, helping White Ensign to win the Essex Intermediate League in 2005. Holmes joined Chelmsford City in 2005 and made his debut on 9 November 2005 in a 3–1 Isthmian League Cup win against Horsham. Holmes made his full league debut for Chelmsford in August 2006, in a 1–1 draw against Bromley, also taking part in the club's impressive run in the FA Cup that year. He went on to become one of the club's top players, achieving promotion to the Conference South in 2007–08, a season in which he also won the club's player of the year award, scored 16 league goals. He also was linked with Championship side Crystal Palace. He remained a regular starter for the following two seasons.

On 5 February 2008, Holmes was named in the England C squad for the match against Wales Semi-pro. On the 21st he made his international debut for the side.

Holmes finished 2009–10 as City's top scorer, with 21 goals in the season. However, he was released in May 2010 after City allowed him to pursue his career at a higher level.

Barnet
On 15 June 2010, Holmes signed a contract with Barnet. He made his debut on 7 August, against Chesterfield. Holmes scored his first goal for Barnet on 20 November, in a 4–1 win over Northampton Town. The 2010–11 season ended prematurely in January for Holmes as he was ruled out for the rest of the season with a foot injury.

The 2011–12 season was more successful for Holmes. Under the management of Edgar Davids, Holmes' position was moved further towards the left wing, where he managed to score 10 goals. During the season, he consolidated his position in the Barnet first team. In an interview with Sky Sports that he believed he was better off playing as a second striker behind Izale McLeod (Bees' topscorer). In 2012–13, he scored a hat-trick on 21 December 2012, in a 3–2 win against Burton Albion. In February 2013, he suffered the same foot injury, and was sidelined for the rest of the season.

After Barnet's relegation, Holmes was linked to a number of clubs, the likes of Portsmouth, Leyton Orient, Gillingham, Burton Albion and Southend United providing competition for his signature.

Portsmouth
Holmes signed a two-year deal with Portsmouth on 21 June 2013, following the expiry of his contract at Barnet. He made his debut in a 4–1 home defeat to Oxford United on 3 August 2013. On 14 September, Holmes scored his first Pompey goal, in a 2–1 away victory over Burton Albion. Holmes received the fans' Player of the Season award in 2013–14.

Northampton Town
On 2 January 2015, Holmes joined Northampton on an initial one-month loan deal. On 27 January 2015, after appearing in four matches and scoring once, he signed a -year permanent deal with the club.

Charlton Athletic
Holmes made a transfer request to Northampton on 15 June 2016 after repeated bids by Charlton and one day later after the 2 clubs eventually agreed a fee of £125,000, Holmes signed a two-year deal with the Addicks being the first signing for new manager Russell Slade. He scored his first goals for Charlton when he scored twice in a 3–0 win over Shrewsbury Town on 16 August 2016.

Sheffield United
On 15 January 2018, Holmes made the switch from Charlton Athletic to Sheffield United for an undisclosed fee after a year and a half at the Valley, rejoining former Northampton manager Chris Wilder.

He was transfer-listed by Sheffield United at the end of the 2018–19 season.

On 4 May 2020, having been released at the end of his Sheffield United contract, Holmes stated that he would retire from professional football due to a back injury picked up whilst working on a building site in Horsham, during his time playing semi-professionally at Chelmsford City.

Oxford United (loan)
On 9 August 2018, Holmes signed for Oxford United on a season-long loan. He returned to his parent club in January 2019 for treatment after his appearances were limited by a back injury.

Gillingham (loan)
Holmes signed for Gillingham on loan on transfer deadline day in January 2019. He joined the club despite being injured, in an effort to regain fitness. On 24 April 2019, however, he returned to parent club Sheffield United after he had failed to regain fitness. He made no appearances for Gillingham during his three months at the club.

Return to Northampton Town
Holmes re-joined Northampton on an "appearance related contract" on 2 November 2020, having spent time training with the club to regain fitness.

Southend United
On 18 February 2021, Holmes joined League Two side Southend United on a deal until the end of the 2020–21 season.

Farnborough
Holmes signed for Farnborough in August 2021.

Career statistics

1 Including matches for Football League Cup, Football Conference League Cup and Isthmian League Cup.

2 Including matches for FA Trophy, Football League Trophy, Football Conference play-offs and Essex Senior Cup.

Honours
Northampton Town
Football League Two: 2015–16

Individual
PFA Team of the Year: 2015–16 League Two
Charlton Athletic Player of the Season: 2016–17
Portsmouth Player of the Season: 2013–14

References

External links

1987 births
Living people
English footballers
England semi-pro international footballers
Association football wingers
Association football forwards
Southend Manor F.C. players
White Ensign F.C. players
Chelmsford City F.C. players
Barnet F.C. players
Portsmouth F.C. players
Northampton Town F.C. players
Southend United F.C. players
Charlton Athletic F.C. players
Sheffield United F.C. players
English Football League players
National League (English football) players
Isthmian League players
Southern Football League players
Oxford United F.C. players
Gillingham F.C. players
Farnborough F.C. players